Santa Maragarida de Montbui is a municipality in the comarca of the Anoia in Catalonia,
Spain. It is situated in the Òdena Basin, immediately to the west of Igualada of which it effectively forms a
suburb. The ajuntament (town hall) is in Sant Maure. Other neighbourhoods in Montbui are the Old Town, el Saió-Coll del Guix and La Mallola.

Demography 
Montbui has received a huge immigration in the late fifties.

Geography 
The most famous mountain in Santa Margarida de Montbui is called La Tossa. It has an altitude of 650 m. La Tossa mountain belongs to the serra de Miralles-Queralt range. In this mountain there is a Romanesque chapel devoted to Virgin Mary and dating back to the 11th century.

The Anoia river borders Santa Margarida de Montbui to the South and separates this municipality from Igualada.

Education and culture 
In Montbui there are three primary education schools (Montbou, García Lorca and Antoni Gaudí) and a secondary school (Institut Montbui)

Some of the cultural centres in Montbui are La Vinícola (Sant Maure) and the Ateneu Cultural i Recreatiu (Old town).

References

 Panareda Clopés, Josep Maria; Rios Calvet, Jaume; Rabella Vives, Josep Maria (1989). Guia de Catalunya, Barcelona: Caixa de Catalunya.  (Spanish).  (Catalan).

External links
Official website 
 Government data pages 

Municipalities in Anoia